Henry George Widdowson (born 28 May 1935) is a British linguist and an authority in the field of applied linguistics and language teaching, specifically English language learning and teaching.

Career
He gained a PhD in Linguistics from the University of Edinburgh in 1973.

Widdowson was the first Chair of Applied Linguistics at the Institute of Education, University of London. He is Emeritus Professor of Education, University of London, and has also been Professor of Applied Linguistics at the University of Essex and Professor of English Linguistics at the University of Vienna, where he holds an Honorary Professorship (Department of English). Since the 1990s, Widdowson lives and works in Vienna, Austria. He is the Applied Linguistics adviser to Oxford University Press and series adviser of Oxford Bookworms Collection. Widdowson is co-editor of Language Teaching: A Scheme for Teacher Education. He is the series editor of Oxford Introductions to Language Study and the author of Linguistics (1996) in the same series. He has also published Defining Issues in English Language Teaching (2002), and Practical Stylistics: An Approach to Poetry (1992).

Research
Widdowson is perhaps best known for his contribution to communicative language teaching. However, he has also published on other related subjects such as discourse analysis and critical discourse analysis, the global spread of English, English for Special Purposes and stylistics.The Routledge Encyclopedia of Language Teaching and Learning calls him "probably the most influential philosopher of the late twentieth century for international ESOL" (674).

He has authored a number of highly influential papers. His 1994 paper in TESOL Quarterly, for instance, has become a key paper in the rationale behind English as a lingua franca and what has become known as the "ownership" of English.

One of his recent books is Text, Context, Pretext. Critical Issues in Discourse Analysis (2005), published by Blackwell's.

Selected publications 
Widdowson, H. (2003). Defining Issues in English Language Teaching (Oxford Applied Linguistics) (1st ed.). Oxford University Press.

Widdowson, H. (2007). Discourse Analysis (Oxford Introduction to Language Study Series). Oxford University Press.

Widdowson, H. G. (1978). Teaching Language as Communication (Oxford Applied Linguistics) (1st ed.). Oxford University Press.

Articles (brief extract) 

 Widdowson, Henry G. (1992) "ELT and EL Teacher." ELT Journal 46/4. 333-339.
 Widdowson, Henry G. (1993) "Proper Words in proper Places." ELT Journal 47/4. 317-329.
Widdowson, Henry G. (1994) "The Ownership of English". TESOL Quarterly 28/2 377-89.
Widdowson, Henry G. (1997) "EIL, ESL, EFL: global Issues and local Interests". World Englishes 16/1. 146-53.
Widdowson, Henry G. (1998a) " EIL: squaring the Circles. A Reply." World Englishes 17/3 397-401.
Widdowson, Henry G. (1998b) "Communication and Community. The Pragmatics of ESP." English for Specific Purposes 17/1 3-14.
 Widdowson, Henry G. (1998c) "The Theory and Practice of Critical Discourse Analysis." Applied Linguistics 19/1 136-151.

References

External links 
 H.G. Widdowson on TESOL 
 Biography of H.G. Widdowson @ OUP 
 Text, Context, Pretext. Critical Issues in Discourse Analysis (2005)
 University of Vienna, Department of English

1935 births
Living people
Applied linguists
Academics of the University of Essex
Academics of the University of London
Linguists from the United Kingdom
Academic staff of the University of Vienna
Alumni of the University of Edinburgh
British expatriates in Austria